Kondo Arimiyaou   (born February 18, 1991 in Lomé) is a Togolese footballer, who currently plays as a midfielder for AS Douanes Lomé.

Career 
On August 7, 2012, Kondo signed for the Algerian club CA Batna.

He scored on his international debut versus Niger on 10 August 2011.

On his second appearance, he scored the only goal of the game against Botswana in September 2011, in a 2012 Africa Cup of Nations qualification game.

References

Togolese footballers
Togo international footballers
Living people
1991 births
Association football forwards
21st-century Togolese people